Donnerskirchen  is a market town in the district Eisenstadt-Umgebung in the Austrian state of Burgenland.

History

World War II
During World War II a small concentration camp was located near the village. In 1951, Nikolaus Schorn was convicted of the murder of Jewish slave laborers in the Donnerskirchen camp in January, 1945, and sentenced to life imprisonment. Schorn was head of the camp. Most of his victims were Hungarian Jews.

Population

See also 
 The Holocaust

References

External links
 Nona.net — region maps of Donnerskirchen
 www.WineDirectories.com  — Wineries in Donnerskirchen
 www.WebTourist.net — Tourism information

Cities and towns in Eisenstadt-Umgebung District
Wine regions of Austria